Bethanie Mattek-Sands and Lucie Šafářová were the defending champions, but lost in the first round to Kiki Bertens and Johanna Larsson.

Martina Hingis and Sania Mirza had the chance to hold all four Grand Slam championship titles, but lost in the third round to Barbora Krejčíková and Kateřina Siniaková. It would have been Hingis' second non-calendar year Grand Doubles Slam, following her first in 1998–99 and as well attempting to complete a triple career Grand Slam in doubles.

Caroline Garcia and Kristina Mladenovic won the title, defeating Ekaterina Makarova and Elena Vesnina in the final, 6–3, 2–6, 6–4. Garcia and Mladenovic became the first all French women's doubles players to win the home Grand Slam since Gail Sherriff Chanfreau and Françoise Dürr in 1971, and the first of any French women to win since Mary Pierce who won in 2000, partnering Hingis.

Seeds

Draw

Finals

Top half

Section 1

Section 2

Bottom half

Section 3

Section 4

References
 Draw
2016 French Open – Women's draws and results at the International Tennis Federation

Women's Doubles
2016 in French women's sport
French Open by year – Women's doubles
French Open - Women's Doubles